Chymotrypsin-like elastase family member 2B is and enzyme that in humans is encoded by the  CELA2B gene.

Function 

Elastases form a subfamily of serine proteases that hydrolyze many proteins in addition to elastin. Humans have six elastase genes which encode the structurally similar proteins elastase 1, 2, 2A, 2B, 3A, and 3B. Like most of the human elastases, elastase 2B is secreted from the pancreas as a zymogen. In other species, elastase 2B has been shown to preferentially cleave proteins after leucine, methionine, and phenylalanine residues.

References

External links

Further reading